Margaret Clarkson (born August 13, 1941) was born in Rotherham, West Riding of Yorkshire, England and trained as an artist at Rotherham School of Art and Bromley College of Art. Later she became an art teacher in South Yorkshire. Clarkson  works mainly with water colours and is best known for nostalgic scenes set in 1940s and 1950s England.

She is known for her paintings, limited edition prints and greeting cards which have been exhibited in galleries and art retail outlets throughout UK, including the  National Trust in England, Wales and Northern Ireland. Commissions of her work have included book illustrations such as in the autobiography Life in a Liberty Bodice. Random recollections of a Yorkshire childhood. Clarkson is a member of the Fine Art Trade Guild and was a finalist in  their Best Selling Published Artist awards in 2006, 2007 and 2008.

Notes

References 
 Christabel Burniston (illustrated by Margaret Clarkson). Smith Settle. 2nd revised edition (November 1995).

External links 
Margaret Clarkson Official website
Clarkson's work at John Bird Studio

1941 births
Living people
20th-century English painters
21st-century English painters
20th-century English women artists
21st-century English women artists
English watercolourists
English women painters
Modern painters
People from Rotherham
Women watercolorists